Bed khvah(2)    is a village in Khwahan Badakhshan Province in north-eastern Afghanistan.

References

External links
Bēḏ Khāh (2)37°45'51" N, 70°22'54" E

Populated places in Khwahan District